Jessie Rose Vala (born 1977, Madison, Wisconsin) is an American installation artist working in drawing, painting, ceramic, paper sculpture, and video. She received an MFA from University of Oregon and a BFA in painting and ceramic sculpture from California College of the Arts in Oakland, California. Her work explores non-linear narratives and environments through an ongoing investigation of the shifting relationships to ourselves and our surroundings. Throughout her work is a questioning of the boundaries between animate and inanimate, the rational and the supernatural, science and spirituality. Installation and multi-channel video allows Vala’s work to negate hierarchy, allowing for multiplicity of connections and realities.

Vala is part of the collaboration Light Hits, creating installations, music, and videos with artist Kelie Bowman. In 2014 Vala started Ungrund Collective, showcasing videos of five contemporary artists working within similar humanistic inquiries. Vala’s work has been exhibited nationally and internationally including exhibitions in San Francisco, Miami, Portland, New York, Tokyo and Mexico.

References

External links
 Official Website
 Ungrund Collective
 Light Hits
 Interview with Bitch Magazine
 Interview with Cinders Gallery
 Jessie Rose Vala on Fecal Face

1977 births
Living people
21st-century American artists
Artists from Madison, Wisconsin
American women installation artists
American installation artists
American experimental filmmakers
American multimedia artists
California College of the Arts alumni
21st-century American women artists
Sculptors from Wisconsin
Women experimental filmmakers